Whitehall-Coplay School District is a public school district in Lehigh County, Pennsylvania in the Lehigh Valley region of eastern Pennsylvania. It serves the borough of Coplay and Whitehall Township. 

The school district has one high school for grades nine through 12, Whitehall High School, one middle school for grades five through eight (Whitehall-Coplay Middle School), and three elementary schools (Gockley, Steckel, and Zephyr). As of the 2021–22 school year, the school district had a total enrollment of 4,146 students between its five schools, according to National Center for Education Statistics data. 

All of the district's schools are located on a single 143-acre campus, which also contains the school district's sports and administration facilities. The elementary schools are divided by grade: Clarence M. Gockley Elementary School (K-1), George D. Steckel Elementary School (2-3), Zephyr Elementary School (4-5). The school district is overseen by a nine-member board of directors, who are elected by district for staggered four-year terms. Approximately 53% of the district's students are considered economically disadvantaged and are eligible for free or reduced price lunch.

Schools
Whitehall High School
Whitehall-Coplay Middle School
Zephyr Elementary School
Steckel Elementary School
Gockley Elementary School

References

External links
Official website
Whitehall-Coplay School District on Facebook

School districts in Lehigh County, Pennsylvania